Disenchanted may refer to:

 Disenchanted (film), the 2022 sequel to Disney's Enchanted
 Disenchanted (soundtrack), by Alan Menken
 "Disenchanted" (Michael Martin Murphey song), 1984
 "Disenchanted", a 1986 song by the Communards from Communards
 "Disenchanted", a 2001 song by Smash Mouth from Smash Mouth
 "Disenchanted", a 2006 song by My Chemical Romance from The Black Parade
 "Disenchanted", a 2010 song by Ash from  A–Z Series 
 Disenchanted, a 2015 album by Handguns (band)

See also 
 Disenchantment (disambiguation)